See the Sun is the third studio album by Australian singer-songwriter Pete Murray. It was released on 25 September 2005 and peaked at number 1 on the ARIA charts.

During the making of the See the Sun, Murray and the band regularly updated an online blog on Murray's official site so that fans could follow the process and get a feel for the album's sound. On this blog, it was stated by a member of the band that "Better Days" was the hardest song on the album to record, as it took multiple recording sessions before they produced the album version.

Track listing
All tracks by Pete Murray
 "Opportunity" – 3:37
 "Class A" – 3:04
 "Fly with You" – 4:20
 "Smile" – 3:39
 "Better Days" – 3:43
 "George's Helper" – 3:50
 "Lost Soul" – 2:52
 "Remedy" – 4:28
 "Trust" – 2:51
 "See the Sun" – 3:25
 "Security" – 3:39
 "This Pill" – 4:39
Reference:

Personnel 
Nicky Bomba – percussion
David Paul Jr. Collins – A&R
Stefanie Fife – cello
Jack Howard – trumpet
Anthony Lycenko – electric guitar
Jimi Maroudas – engineer
Ben McCarthy – bass, keyboards, backing vocals, producer
Pete Murray – acoustic guitar, electric guitar, vocals, producer
Keely Pressly – backing vocals
Eric Sarafin – producer, engineer, mixing
Jeremy Holland Smith – French horn
John Watson – management

Charts

Weekly charts

Year-end charts

Decade-end chart

Certifications

References

2005 albums
Pete Murray (Australian singer-songwriter) albums